The Hussards de la Mort or Death Hussars were a French light cavalry company formed during the French Revolution.

History

On June 12, 1792 a squadron was created by the French Assembly formed from 200 volunteers. In July, Kellermann organizes the company naming Hussards de la Mort - Death Hussars. These volunteers, coming from mostly wealthy families, were provided with horses from the King's stables.

On March 5, 1793 survivors of the squadron were merged into the 14th Cavalry Regiment by decree from the National Convention.

On April 25, 1793 the squadron was dissolved.

Uniform
 Mirliton: black
 Collar: black
 Dolman: black
 Pelisse: black
 Facing : black
 Braids: white
 Breeches : black

The symbol of a skull and crossbones was placed on the mirliton, the sabretache and the shoulder sleeve. The uniform was inspired by the insignia of the Prussian hussars. Even after merging with the 14th Cavalry Regiment, they kept their uniform.

Mottos 
Vaincre ou mourir, La liberté ou la mort ou Vivre libre ou mourir - Victory or death, Freedom or death, Live free or die

Theaters of operation 
 Battle of Valmy
 Battle of Fleurus (1794)

See also 
French cavalry regiments
French hussar regiments

Sources

External links 
Les Hussards français, Tome 1, De l'Ancien régime à l'Empire édition Histoire et collection
Uniform of the Death Hussars (in french)
 Replicas of the uniform (in french)
 The Death Hussars (in french)
 1793 Uniform illustration at NYPL

French Revolution
Cavalry regiments of France
Regiments of the French First Republic
Military units and formations established in 1792
Military units and formations disestablished in 1793
Hussars